Glipostenoda klapperichi is a species of beetle in the genus Glipostenoda. It was described in 1952. This species of beetle is from the Spartel family. The name was given to this beetle by a man named Ermisch. It is in the genus Glipostenoda.

References

klapperichi
Beetles described in 1952